Bairagarh is a locality in the Bhopal district of Madhya Pradesh, India. It is located in the Berasia tehsil, near Berasia-Vidisha road and the Dungaria dam.

Demographics 

According to the 2011 census of India, Bairagarh has 214 households. The effective literacy rate (i.e. the literacy rate of population excluding children aged 6 and below) is 69.84%.

References 

Villages in Berasia tehsil